The Port Hills are the hills between Christchurch and its port Lyttelton.

Port Hills may also refer to:

In Christchurch
2017 Port Hills fires, two wild fires during February of that year
Port Hills (New Zealand electorate), one of the current electorates for the New Zealand House of Representatives
Port Hills Fault, an inferred active seismic fault believed to be located beneath the Port Hills near Christchurch

Elsewhere
Port Hills (Nelson), the prominent hills in Nelson, New Zealand along the coastline

See also
Porthill (disambiguation)